Viforâta River can refer to one of the following rivers in Romania:

 Viforâta, a tributary of the Milei in Buzău County
 Viforâta, a tributary of the Motnău in Vrancea County